Gandhada Gudi is a 2022 Indian Kannada-language docudrama film directed by Amoghavarsha JS. It stars himself and Puneeth Rajkumar in lead roles. The film features the  final appearance of actor Puneeth Rajkumar. The film released on 28 October 2022.

Premise 
Puneeth Rajkumar, who is also known to be an avid travel and adventure buff, decides to explore Karnataka’s rich bio-diversity, for which he teams up with the award-winning wildlife filmmaker Amoghavarsha JS. Together, they embark on a journey across the length and breadth of the state, where they come across a visual spectacle of hidden gems.

Cast 
 Puneeth Rajkumar as himself
 Amoghavarsha JS as himself
 Ashwini Puneeth Rajkumar as herself

Music
The music of the film was composed by B. Ajaneesh Loknath.

Release 
The film released on 28 October 2022.

Home Media

The digital rights of the film were secured by Amazon Prime Video, and was digitally streamed from 17 March 2023 on the occasion of birth anniversary of Puneeth Rajkumar.

References

External links
 

2022 films
2022 drama films
Indian docudrama films
2020s Kannada-language films